Ferenc Berényi (Dévaványa, November 9, 1927 – Budapest, August 2, 2004) was a Hungarian painter.

He studied at the Hungarian Academy of Fine Arts between 1949 and 1953 where his prominent teachers were Jenő Barcsay and Endre Domanovszky. From 1954 he was a regular participant of many exhibitions in Hungary and many other cities, like Moscow, Prague, Warsaw, Sofia, Košice, Kuwait, Bombay, Lausanne, Teheran, Paris, Basel, Washington and Helsinki.
In 1961 he was one of the founding members of the Studio of Young Artists. In the same year he got a three-year Derkovits Scholarship and moved to Szolnok where he lived and continued his art until 2004. 
He was a two-time board member of the painter class of direction of the Hungarian Fine and Applied Arts.  From 1975 to 1982 he taught at the University of Art and Design.

Awards

1961-1964: Derkovits Scholarship
1966: Artists Union Country Council Art Award
1968: Munkácsy Award
1975: Szolnok Painter Triennial, 1st Prize,
1978: Szolnok County Council Art Award

Exhibitions
1964 • Szolnok, Szigligeti Theater
1966 • Hungarian National Gallery, Budapest
1967 • Ernst Museum, Budapest
1967 • Szolnok, János Damjanich Museum
1968 • Hódmezővásárhely, János Tornyai Museum
1979 • Horticultural Institute
1981 • Sofia
1983 • Szolnok, Collective Studio
1984 • Szolnok, Cultural Center
2003 • Szolnok, János Damjanich Museum
2007. November 9. - 2008. February Szolnok Gallery, In memoriam Berényi Ferenc

Works in public ownership
Budapest, Hungarian National Gallery
Szolnok, János Damjanich Museum
Hódmezővásárhely, János Tornyai Museum,
Sárospatak, Art Gallery
Miskolc, Art Gallery
Helsinki, Hungarian Embassy
Washington, D.C., Hungarian Embassy
Athens, Hungarian Embassy

References

1927 births
2004 deaths
Hungarian University of Fine Arts alumni
20th-century Hungarian painters
20th-century Hungarian male artists
Hungarian male painters